Victor David Gruen, born Viktor David Grünbaum (July 18, 1903 – February 14, 1980), was an Austrian-American architect best known as a pioneer in the design of shopping malls in the United States. He is also noted for his urban revitalization proposals, described in his writings and applied in master plans such as for Fort Worth, Texas (1955), Kalamazoo, Michigan (1958) and Fresno, California (1965). An advocate of prioritizing pedestrians over cars in urban cores, he was also the designer of the first outdoor pedestrian mall in the United States, the Kalamazoo Mall.

Biography

Early life
Victor Gruen was born on July 18, 1903, in a middle-class Jewish family in Vienna, Austria. He studied architecture at the Vienna Academy of Fine Arts. A committed socialist, from 1926 until 1934 he ran the "political cabaret at the Naschmarkt"-theatre. At that time he came to know Felix Slavik, the future mayor of Vienna, and they became friends.

Career
As an architect he worked for Peter Behrens, and in 1933 opened his own architectural firm in Vienna. His firm specialized in remodeling of shops and apartments.

When Germany annexed Austria in 1938, he emigrated to the United States. Short and stout, he landed "with an architect's degree, eight dollars, and no English." Arriving in New York he changed his name to Gruen from Grünbaum and started to work as a draftsman. After the success of his design for the Lederer leather-goods boutique on Fifth Avenue, he received further commissions for the design of shops, including Ciro’s on Fifth Avenue, Steckler’s on Broadway, Paris Decorators on the Bronx Concourse, and eleven branches of the clothing chain Grayson’s.

In 1941 Gruen moved to Los Angeles. He was naturalized as a US citizen in 1943. In 1951, he founded the architectural firm "Victor Gruen Associates", which was soon to become one of the major planning offices of that time. After the war, he designed the first suburban open-air shopping facility called Northland Mall near Detroit in 1954. After the success of the first project, he designed his best-known work for the owners of Dayton Department stores, the  Southdale Mall in Edina, Minnesota, the first enclosed shopping mall in the country. Opening in 1956, Southdale was meant as the kernel of a full-fledged community. The mall was commercially successful, but the original design was never fully realized, as the intended apartment buildings, schools, medical facilities, park and lake were not built. Because he invented the modern mall, Malcolm Gladwell, writing in The New Yorker, suggested that "Victor Gruen may well have been the most influential architect of the twentieth century."

Until the mid-1970s, his office designed over fifty shopping malls in the United States. Gruen was the principal architect for a luxury housing development built on the  site of Boston, Massachusetts' former West End neighborhood. The first of several Gruen towers and plazas was completed in 1962. This development, known as Charles River Park is regarded by many as a dramatically ruthless re-imagining of a former immigrant tenement neighborhood (Gans, O'Conner, The Hub). In 1956, Gruen drafted a comprehensive revitalization plan for the central business district of downtown Fort Worth, Texas, but most components of the plan were never realized.   Dr. ETH Ing. Walid Jabri, the architect and structural engineer, designed the 55,000 square-meter business complex Centre Gefinor, which was built in the late 1960s on Rue Clémenceau in Beirut, Lebanon for which Victor Gruen designed the complete commercial area on the ground floor and the mezzanine after the completion of the skeleton. Gruen also designed the Greengate Mall in Greensburg, Pennsylvania, which opened in 1965, as well as the Lakehurst Mall in 1971 for Waukegan, Illinois.

In 1968, he returned to Vienna, where he engaged in the gradual transformation of the inner city into a pedestrian zone, of which only some parts have been implemented, including Kärntner Straße and Graben.

In a speech in London in 1978, Gruen disavowed shopping mall developments as having "bastardized" his ideas:  "I refuse to pay alimony for those bastard developments. They destroyed our cities." Gruen died on February 14, 1980.

Influence
Gruen's book The Heart of our Cities: The Urban Crisis, Diagnosis and Cure was a big influence on Walt Disney's city planning ambitions and his ideas for the original EPCOT.

Gruen v. Gruen
In 1963, on his 21st birthday, his  son New York attorney Michael S. Gruen (then a Harvard undergraduate) was given a painting "Schloss Kammer am Attersee II" by Gustav Klimt. While ownership of the painting was given to his son in 1963, the elder Gruen continued to hang it in his living room and even paid for insurance and repairs. Upon Gruen's death in 1980, his widow, Kemija, refused to surrender the painting to Michael, resulting in a landmark case in the New York Supreme Court and Court of Appeals. The Court of Appeals ruled the basis of inter vivos gifts, including the plaintiff having the burden of proof to a clear and convincing standard that the chattel was a gift and the required elements of a gift. Kemija Gruen claimed that if the painting was to be given after death, even if such arrangement was made years earlier, then the will, not a letter, would be instructive as to disposition. Michael Gruen was eventually awarded $2.5 million.

Works

Shopping malls designed by Gruen

Northland Center, Southfield, Michigan, 1954
Woodmar Plaza, Hammond, Indiana, 1954
Westfield Valley Fair, San Jose, California, 1956
Southdale Center, Edina, Minnesota, 1956
Riverside Plaza, Riverside, California, 1957
Bayfair Center, San Leandro, California, 1957
Eastland Center, Harper Woods, Michigan, 1957
Glendale Town Center, Indianapolis, Indiana, 1958
Maryvale Shopping City, Phoenix, Arizona, 1959
Kalamazoo Mall, Kalamazoo, Michigan, 1959
South Bay Center, Redondo Beach, California, 1959
South Shore Plaza, Braintree, Massachusetts, 1961
Winrock Center, Albuquerque, New Mexico, 1961
Cherry Hill Mall, Cherry Hill, New Jersey, 1961
Brookdale Center, Brooklyn Center, Minnesota, 1962
Midtown Plaza, Rochester, New York, 1962
Northway Mall, Pittsburgh, Pennsylvania, 1962
Randhurst Mall, Mount Prospect, Illinois, 1962
 South County Center, St Louis Missouri, 1963
Westfield Topanga, Canoga Park, California, 1964
Fulton Mall, Fresno, California, 1964
Greengate Mall, Pittsburgh, Pennsylvania, 1965
South Hills Village, Pittsburgh, Pennsylvania, 1965
Westland Center, Westland, Michigan, 1965
Plymouth Meeting Mall, Plymouth Meeting, Pennsylvania, 1966
South Coast Plaza, Costa Mesa, California, 1967
Midland Mall, Warwick, Rhode Island, 1967
Park Lane Centre, Reno, Nevada, 1967
Monroeville Mall, Monroeville, Pennsylvania, 1969

Shopping centers designed by Gruen Associates

Yorktown Center, Lombard, Illinois, 1968
Rosedale Center, Roseville, Minnesota, 1969
Southland Center, Taylor, Michigan, 1970
Lakehurst Mall, Waukegan, Illinois, 1971
Central City Mall, San Bernardino, California, 1972
Commons Mall, Columbus, Indiana, 1973
Ridgedale Center, Minnetonka, Minnesota, 1974
Westfield Culver City, Culver City, California, 1975
Twelve Oaks Mall, Novi, Michigan, 1977
Port Plaza Mall, Green Bay, Wisconsin, 1977

Other
Millron's Westchester (later The Broadway Westchester), 1949, Westchester, Los Angeles, 1949
Gateway Center (Newark), in Newark, New Jersey, 1970s

Selected writings
 Victor Gruen, Larry Smith (1960) Shopping Towns USA: The Planning of Shopping Centers New York: Reinhold
 Victor Gruen (1965) The Heart of our Cities: The Urban Crisis. Diagnosis and Cure London: Thames and Hudson  
 Victor Gruen (1973) Centers for the Urban Environment: Survival of the Cities. New York: Van Nostrand Reinhold

In media 

 Victor Gruen is the namesake of an Australian TV series named Gruen on the ABC which analyses advertising.

See also 

 Fox Plaza (San Francisco)
 Gateway Center (Newark)
 Gruen transfer
 South Coast Plaza
 Wilshire Beverly Center

References

Notes

Sources

Further reading
 M. Jeffrey Hardwick, Mall Maker: Victor Gruen, Architect of an American Dream, University of Pennsylvania Press, 2003, 
 Anette Baldauf, "Shopping Town USA: Victor Gruen, the Cold War, and the Shopping Mall". In: Mute 30.1. 2008
 Anette Baldauf and Katharina Weingartner: The Gruen Effect. Victor Gruen and the Shopping Mall. Documentary, Austria/US 2010, 54 min.

External links 

 Mall Hall of Fame Victor Gruen's Malls
Victor Gruen papers at the University of Wyoming - American Heritage Center
Victor Gruen Digital collection at the American Heritage Center
To read more on research done at the AHC archives for Victor Gruen see The AHC blog

Austrian architects
Jewish architects
Austrian socialists
American socialists
Austrian Jews
American people of Austrian-Jewish descent
Artists from Vienna
Columbia University faculty
1903 births
1980 deaths
Academy of Fine Arts Vienna alumni
Urban theorists
20th-century American architects
Emigrants from Austria to the United States after the Anschluss
Jewish socialists